Ridgemont may refer to:

Ridgemont, Oakland, California, a neighborhood in Oakland, California
Ridgemont (Pittsburgh), a neighborhood in Pittsburgh, Pennsylvania
Ridgemont High School (Ottawa)
Fast Times at Ridgemont High, a 1982 film starring Sean Penn

See also
Ridgmont, a village in Bedfordshire in England